Santorso is a town in the province of Vicenza, Veneto, northern Italy. It is north of SP350 highway.

Santorso is home to several patrician villas: the oldest is the Villa Facci which dates to the 15th century. The church of S. Maria Immacolata was built between 1834 and 1839 in neoclassical style.

The Renaissance Villa Floriani houses frescos by the artist Giovanni Demio for display.

The 19th century Villa Rossi is owned by the commune of Santorso and. The annexed park, designed by Negrin, includes an aquarium, rare plants and brooks running through lush vegetation to the main lake. It is home to a large live collection of butterflies in a walk through atrium. The park also features train rides, farm animals and children's play areas.

Twin towns
Santorso is twinned with:

  Vejano, Italy
  Brissago, Switzerland

References

Sources
Santorso Guide with photos
Google Maps

Cities and towns in Veneto